Botond Antal (born 22 August 1991) is a Hungarian football player who plays for Tiszakécske.

Club career
On 18 June 2021, Antal signed with Mezőkövesd.

On 2 July 2022, Antal moved to second-tier club Tiszakécske.

Club statistics

Updated to games played as of 20 May 2021.

References

External links
Profile at MLSZ 
Profile at HLSZ 

1991 births
Footballers from Budapest
Living people
Hungarian footballers
Hungary youth international footballers
Association football goalkeepers
Watford F.C. players
Kecskeméti TE players
Kaposvári Rákóczi FC players
Diósgyőri VTK players
Mezőkövesdi SE footballers
Tiszakécske FC footballers
Nemzeti Bajnokság I players
Nemzeti Bajnokság II players
Hungarian expatriate footballers
Expatriate footballers in England
Hungarian expatriate sportspeople in England